Johann Frank may refer to:

 Johann Frank (footballer) (1938 – 2010), Austrian football player and coach
 Johann Frank (general) (born 1969) is an officer of the Austrian Armed Forces and political scientist

See also 
 Johann Franck (1618 – 1677), German politician, lyric poet and hymnist
 Johann Frank Kirchbach (1859 – 1912), German historical-, portrait-, genre- and landscape-painter, graphic designer and illustrator
 Johann Peter Frank (1745 – 1821), German physician and hygienist